Nangal Nunia is a village in the Mahendergarh district of Haryana, India. It is on Narnaul (Haryana)- Behror(Rajasthan) road. It has at least one branch of Punjab National Bank.
Nangal Nunia Sarpanch seat is Unreserved.

Adjacent villages
 
 Nangal Shyalu
 Nangal Pipa
 Nangal Nunia
 Nangal Kalia
 Nangal Dargu
 Nangal Chaudhary
 Nangal Soda

Demographics of 2011
As of 2011 India census, Nangal Nunia had a population of 1135 in 198 households. Males (595) constitute 52.42%  of the population and females (540) 47.57%. Nangal Nunia has an average literacy (414) rate of 36.47%, lower than the national average of 74%: male literacy (142) is 34.29%, and female literacy (272) is 65.70% of total literates. In Nangal Nunia, 11.31% of the population is under 6 years of age (171).

References 

Cities and towns in Mahendragarh district